The 2021 Oklahoma State Cowboys football team represented Oklahoma State University during the 2021 NCAA Division I FBS football season. The Cowboys played their home games at the Boone Pickens Stadium in Stillwater, Oklahoma, and competed in the Big 12 Conference. The team was led by seventeen-year head coach Mike Gundy.

Previous season

The Cowboys finished the 2020 regular season 8–3 and 6–3 in Big 12 play to finish in third in the conference. They were eligible to play in the post season and was invited to play in the 2020 Cheez-It Bowl against Miami Hurricanes. Oklahoma State won the game by three points against the Hurricanes and finished the 2020 season ranked 20 in the AP Poll rankings.

Schedule 

Schedule Source:

Roster

Game summaries

vs. No. 24 (FCS) Missouri State

vs.Tulsa

at Boise State

vs. No. 25 Kansas State

vs. No. 21 Baylor

at No. 25 Texas

at Iowa State

vs. Kansas

at West Virginia

vs. TCU

at Texas Tech

vs. No. 10 Oklahoma

2021 Big XII Championship vs. No. 9 Baylor

vs. Notre Dame (2022 Fiesta Bowl)

Rankings

References

Oklahoma State
Oklahoma State Cowboys football seasons
Oklahoma State Cowboys football
Fiesta Bowl champion seasons